Vladislav Bulakhov is a Russian conductor, violinist, and Honoured Artist of Russia. He graduated from the Gnessin State Musical College in 1984 and prior to it have served under guidance from Igor Zhukov at the Moscow Chamber Orchestra. His conducting career began when he introduced The Seasons at the First International Festival of Classical Guitar in November 1994. After that he performed it in Moscow and Germany in both of which it boasted him a success.

References

Living people
20th-century births
Gnessin State Musical College alumni
Honored Artists of the Russian Federation
21st-century Russian conductors (music)
Russian male conductors (music)
21st-century Russian male musicians
21st-century violinists
Year of birth missing (living people)